Maud Karin Berglund (later Svensson, 9 March 1934 – 1 June 2000) was a Swedish freestyle swimmer. She was part of the 4 × 100 m relay team that finished sixth at the 1952 Summer Olympics. She also competed in the individual 100 m event, but failed to reach the final.

References

1934 births
2000 deaths
Olympic swimmers of Sweden
Swimmers at the 1952 Summer Olympics
Swedish female freestyle swimmers
SK Neptun swimmers
Swimmers from Stockholm